IMT Gallery (also known as IMT or Image Music Text) is a contemporary art gallery in Bethnal Green in London's East End.

History
IMT Gallery was founded by Lindsay Friend in 2005 as IMT and launched with the first London solo exhibition by O Zhang.  Other artists to have been given their first London solo exhibitions with IMT Gallery include Laura Pawela, Marek Chołoniewski, Lotte Rose Kjær Skau, Henrik Schrat, Mark Peter Wright and Mathew Parkin.  In January 2011 IMT became IMT Gallery and began representing artists alongside its exhibition programme. The gallery currently represents David Burrows,  Paola Ciarska, Lotte Rose Kjær Skau and Plastique Fantastique. Since its founding IMT Gallery is curated by Mark Rohtmaa-Jackson, with Nicole Sansone joining as a co-curator from 2014 to 2016, and Kirsten Cooke joining as co-curator in 2021.

Programme
The gallery has shown an eclectic programme with particular emphasis on installation, sound art and multimedia art alongside exhibitions of represented artists.

Notable exhibitions include Wandering/WILDING: Blackness on the Internet with Niv Acosta, Hannah Black, Evan Ifekoya, E. Jane, Devin Kenny, Tabita Rezaïre and Fannie Sosa, curated by Legacy Russell with associated events at the Institute of Contemporary Arts; Campaign: an exhibition acting as the campaign headquarters for Shrigley's 2015 general election bid for Hackney South and Shoreditch;  P&S Recipe Shop in 2006 in which the gallery was transformed into a fully functioning Malaysian style café by artists Yak Beow Seah and Chong Boon Pok, and 2010's Dead Fingers Talk: The Tape Experiments of William S. Burroughs, an exhibition of unreleased experiments with audio tape by William S. Burroughs alongside work by artists, writers and musicians including Steve Aylett, Lawrence English, Anthony Joseph, Negativland, Plastique Fantastique (David Burrows & Simon O'Sullivan), Giorgio Sadotti, Scanner, Terre Thaemlitz, Thomson & Craighead, Laureana Toledo and Ultra-red.

In 2009 Mark Peter Wright was awarded the BASCA British Composer Award in Sonic Art for his work A Quiet Reverie which was premiered at IMT in 2008 as part of the sound art exhibition Audio Forensics. In 2014  Lotte Rose Kjær Skau won the Helle & Arenth Jacobsen's Grant for Young Artists award at the Kunsthal Charlottenborg Spring Exhibition for her video How to Get Somewhere (2012), exhibited at IMT Gallery earlier that year.

From 2009-15 the gallery also hosted regular screenings and events curated by Filmarmalade, a London-based publisher and DVD label specialising in contemporary artists' film and video works.

IMT Gallery's exhibitions have been supported by a number of institutions including the Arts Council England, the Henry Moore Foundation, the Japan Foundation, the OCA: the Office for Contemporary Art Norway, the Statens Kunstfond and the Polish Cultural Institute.

References

External links 
IMT Gallery official website

Contemporary art galleries in London
Event venues established in 2005
2005 establishments in England
Art galleries established in 2005